Luther Skaggs Jr. (March 3, 1923 – April 6, 1976) was a United States Marine who received the Medal of Honor for his heroic actions on the beachhead on Guam during World War II.

Biography

Luther Skaggs Jr. was born on March 3, 1923, in Henderson, Kentucky. He entered the Marine Corps on October 6, 1942, and received recruit training at Parris Island, South Carolina, and Camp Lejeune, North Carolina. He was deployed overseas on March 1, 1943.
Private First Class Skaggs, a squad leader with a weapon section in the 3rd Marine Division, was critically wounded when a Japanese grenade exploded in his foxhole during the night of 21-July 22, 1944 on the Asan-Adelup beachhead on Guam. But instead of calling a corpsman and revealing his outfit's position, he calmly applied a tourniquet to his shattered leg and for eight hours continued to return the enemy's fire with his rifle and hand grenades.

In his Medal of Honor citation, Skaggs is commended for being uncomplaining and calm through this critical period and serving as "a heroic example of courage and fortitude to other wounded men."

When his section leader became a casualty shortly after landing on the beachhead, PFC Skaggs promptly took over and led the section through intense fire for a distance of 200 yards to a strategic position.

It was while defending this vital position that he was wounded, and after fighting throughout the night propped up in his foxhole, he crawled unassisted to the rear where he continued the attack. Only when the Japanese in the area had been annihilated did he seek medical attention. He lost his leg as the result of the wound.

Private First Class Skaggs was referred to as a "tough little guy" by his buddies, who did not know that he had been hit until the battle was over. He was promoted to corporal upon being honorably discharged from active service in the Marine Corps on April 4, 1946.

The Medal of Honor was presented to him by President Harry S. Truman at a White House ceremony on June 15, 1945, which included presentations to fellow Marine recipients Everett P. Pope and Carlton R. Rouh, as well as Army recipient Gino J. Merli, for their heroism during actions in the Central Pacific and European theatres.

Luther Skaggs Jr. died on April 6, 1976, and was buried in Arlington National Cemetery with full military honors.

Medal of Honor citation

The President of the United States takes pride in presenting the MEDAL OF HONOR to

for service as set forth in the following CITATION:
For conspicuous gallantry and intrepidity at the risk of his life above and beyond the call of duty while serving as Squad Leader with a Mortar Section of Kilo Company in the Third Battalion, Third Marines, Third Marine Division, during action against enemy Japanese forces on the Asan-Adelup Beachhead, Guam, Marianas Islands, on 21–22 July 1944. When the section leader became a casualty under a heavy mortar barrage shortly after landing, Private First Class Skaggs promptly assumed command and led the section through intense fire for a distance of 200 yards to a position from which to deliver effective coverage of the assault on a strategic cliff. Valiantly defending this vital position against strong enemy counterattacks during the night, Private First Class Skaggs was critically wounded when a Japanese grenade lodged in his foxhole and exploded, shattering the lower part of one leg. Quick to act, he applied an improvised tourniquet and, while propped up in his foxhole, gallantly returned the enemy's fire with his rifle and hand grenades for a period of eight hours, later crawling unassisted to the rear to continue to fight until the Japanese had been annihilated. Uncomplaining and calm throughout this critical period, Private First Class Skaggs served as a heroic example of courage and fortitude to other wounded men and, by his courageous leadership and inspiring devotion to duty, upheld the highest traditions for the United States Naval Service.
/S/ FRANKLIN D. ROOSEVELT

See also

List of Medal of Honor recipients
List of Medal of Honor recipients for World War II

References

Further reading
O'Brien, Cyril J. Liberation: Marines in the Recapture of Guam,  Marines in World War II Commemorative Series, Marine Corps Historical Center, United States Marine Corps, 1994.

External links

1923 births
1976 deaths
American amputees
United States Marine Corps personnel of World War II
Burials at Arlington National Cemetery
Military personnel from Kentucky
United States Marine Corps Medal of Honor recipients
United States Marine Corps non-commissioned officers
People from Henderson, Kentucky
World War II recipients of the Medal of Honor